Quest Diagnostics is an American clinical laboratory. A Fortune 500 company, Quest operates in the United States, Puerto Rico, Mexico, and Brazil. Quest also maintains collaborative agreements with various hospitals and clinics across the globe.

As of 2020 the company had approximately 48,000 employees, and generated more than $7.7 billion in revenue in 2019. The company offers access to diagnostic testing services for cancer, cardiovascular disease, infectious disease, neurological disorders, COVID-19, and employment and court-ordered drug testing.

History

1960–1995 
Originally founded as Metropolitan Pathology Laboratory, Inc., in 1967 by Paul A. Brown, MD, the clinical laboratory underwent a variety of name changes. In 1969, the company's name changed to MetPath, Inc. with headquarters in Teaneck, New Jersey. By 1982, MetPath was acquired by what was then known as Corning Glass Works, and subsequently renamed Corning Clinical Laboratories.

1996–2000 
On December 31, 1996, Quest Diagnostics became an independent company as a spin-off from Corning. Kenneth Freeman was appointed as CEO during this transition. Over the next year, Quest acquired a clinical laboratory division of Branford, CT–based Diagnostic Medical Laboratory, Inc. (DML). Two years later in 1999, Quest added SmithKline Beecham Clinical Laboratories to their subsidiaries; which includes a joint venture ownership with CompuNet Clinical Laboratory. The purchase of SmithKline Beecham also included the lab's medical sample transport airline  originally founded in 1988.

2001–2015 

From May 2004 to April 2012, Surya Mohapatra served as the company's President and CEO. In 2007 Quest acquired diagnostic testing equipment company AmeriPath. In response to Mohapatra's resignation after eight years with Quest, former Philips Healthcare CEO Stephen Rusckowski was appointed. Under Rusckowski, Quest Diagnostics teamed up with central New England's largest health care system, UMass Memorial Health Care, to purchase its clinical outreach laboratory.

2016–present 
In 2016, Quest collaborated with Safeway to bring testing services to twelve of its stores in California, Maryland, Virginia, Texas and Colorado.

By the end of 2017, Quest, in partnership with Walmart, incorporated laboratory testing in about 15 of their locations in Texas and Florida.

In May 2018, the company announced it will become an in-network laboratory provider to UnitedHealthcare starting in 2019, providing access to 48 million plan members.

In September 2018, Quest moved its headquarters from Madison, where it was located since 2007, to Secaucus, New Jersey.

In November 2018, Quest launched QuestDirect, a consumer-initiated testing service that allows patients to order health and wellness lab testing from home.

In March 2020, the company launched a COVID-19 testing service. As of July 2020, Quest had performed more than 9.2 million COVID-19 molecular tests and 2.8 million serology tests.

Acquisitions
 2001: Completes acquisition of Ohio-based MedPlus, Inc., a healthcare technology company.
 2002: Completes acquisition of Virginia-based American Medical Laboratories, Inc. (AML) and an affiliated company of AML, LabPortal, Inc., for approximately $500 million in cash.
 2003: Completes acquisition of California-based Unilab Corporation in a transaction valued at approximately $800 million.
 2005: Completes acquisition of Lenexa, Kansas-based LabOne, Inc., which includes the Employer Solutions drug testing division and the ExamOne paramedical testing division, for approximately $934 million.
 2005: Forms a strategic alliance with Ciphergen Biosystems to commercialize novel proteomic tests.
 2006: Completes acquisition of Virginia-based Focus Diagnostics, Inc., an infectious and immunologic disease laboratory, for approximately $185 million in cash.
 2007: Completes acquisition of Sweden-based Hemocue, a point-of-care diagnostic testing company.
 2007: Acquires AmeriPath (and subsidiary Specialty Laboratories) from Welsh, Carson, Anderson & Stowe, becoming the leading provider of cancer diagnostic testing services.
 2011: Acquires Athena Diagnostics from Thermo Fisher Scientific.
 2011: Completes acquisition of Celera Corporation, a company that became famous by its sequencing of the Human Genome.
 2014: Acquires Solstas Lab Partners Group (and subsidiaries).
 2014: Acquires Summit Health, Inc.
 2017: Acquires Cleveland HeartLab, Inc.
2018: Acquires U.S. laboratory services business of Oxford Immunotec.
2019: Acquires clinical laboratory services business of Boyce & Bynum Pathology Laboratories, a provider of diagnostic and clinical laboratory services in the Midwest.
2020: Acquires outreach laboratory service business of Memorial Hermann Health System, a non-for-profit health system in the Greater Houston region.

Controversies
Quest Diagnostics set a record in April 2009 when it paid $302 million to the government to settle a Medicare fraud case alleging the company sold faulty medical testing kits.  It was the largest qui tam (whistleblower) settlement paid by a medical lab for manufacturing and distributing a faulty product. In May 2011, Quest paid $241 million to the state of California to settle a False Claims Act case that alleged the company had overcharged Medi-Cal, the state's Medicaid program, and provided illegal kickbacks as incentives for healthcare providers to use Quest labs.

In 2018, Quest Diagnostics was among a number of US based labs linked to inaccuracies of over 200 women's cervical smear tests for CervicalCheck, Ireland's national screening programme. Audits of the testing performed by Quest (and another subcontractor Clinical Pathology Laboratories, Inc. of Austin Texas) showed a high rate of errors in analysis of samples which led to lawsuits and a government inquiry. Quest and the Irish government continue to settle the resulting lawsuits.

On June 3, 2019, Quest announced that American Medical Collection Agency (AMCA), a billing collections service provider, had informed Quest Diagnostics that an unauthorized user had access to AMCA’s system containing personal information AMCA received from various entities, including from Quest. AMCA provides billing collections services to Optum360, which in turn is a Quest contractor. AMCA later went bankrupt after the breach.

References

External links

Medical technology companies of the United States
Companies listed on the New York Stock Exchange
American companies established in 1967
Companies based in Hudson County, New Jersey
Secaucus, New Jersey
1967 establishments in New York City
Corning Inc.
Life sciences industry
Health care companies based in New Jersey
1982 mergers and acquisitions
Corporate spin-offs